Anders Brørby (born 1984) is a Norwegian composer and sound artist, based in Oslo. He was a founding member and songwriter in progressive / psychedelic band Radiant Frequency.

Discography

Solo

Albums
You Were There With Me (Feral Delight, 2014)
Nocturnal Phases (Feral Delight, 2014)
Holiday Affairs (Feral Delight, 2015)
Phoenix Down (Fort Evil Fruit, 2016)
Mulholland Drive, 1984 (Hylé Tapes, 2016)
Nihil (Gizeh Records, 2016)
Traumas (Forwind, 2018)
Rock Bottom (Feral Delight, 2018)
Kill Count (Somewherecold Records, 2019)

EPs
Heartbreaking Lovemaking (Feral Delight, 2015)
And All Became Death (Feral Delight, 2015)
Heartbreaking Lovemaking II (Feral Delight, 2015)

Collaboration albums
Heteroticisms Volume 3: Anders Brørby / Oomny Mozg (Land Animal Tapes, 2016)
Mannen Faller (with Rune Clausen) (Feral Delight/Katuktu Collective, 2017)
Trilogy I: Anders Brørby/The Corrupting Sea (Somewherecold Records, 2019)

With Radiant Frequency
The Abandoned (Big Dipper, 2010)
Brørby Sko (Feral Delight, 2015)

References

External links
Grandø, Olivar “Radiant Frequency utfordrer albumformatet.” musikknyheter, 27 November 2010
Grandø, Olivar “Anders Brørby: Eksperimenterer på egenhånd.” musikknyheter, 6 March 2014

1984 births
Living people
Norwegian composers
Norwegian male composers
Norwegian songwriters
People from Jevnaker
Somewherecold Records artists